Li Guoying (born December 1963) is a Chinese hydraulic engineer-turned-politician, currently serving as governor of Anhui province. Li worked in his early career as a technician and administrator in the national ministry of water works, the Yellow River Commission, and in Heilongjiang province. He was transferred to Anhui in 2015 to serve as deputy party chief before becoming acting governor in 2016.

Biography
He was born in Yuzhou, Henan province. He studied hydroelectric power generation and engineering at North China University of Water Conservancy and Electric Power in Zhengzhou and graduated with a bachelor's degree in 1984. He also had a graduate degree in philosophy from the Central Party School, then a doctorate from Northeast Normal University in environmental science.

After graduating university, Li worked for the Yellow River commission of the Ministry of Water Works as a survey technician for the planning and research department. He spent most of his career in the water works system, as the assistant to the chief engineer, then the deputy director of the Yellow River commission, then chief engineer of the national Ministry of Waterworks. He was then transferred in May 1999 to head the department of water works in Heilongjiang.  

In March 2011, he was named Vice Minister of Water Works and chairman of the Yellow River Commission; he stayed on the post until August 2015, when he was named deputy party chief of Anhui. He was then elevated to acting governor a year later, on September 1, 2016. His elevation confirmed trends that the senior Communist Party leadership was again showing preference for engineering and technical backgrounds over lifelong apparatchiks. At the time of his appointment Li, 52, was the second youngest governor in China. He was confirmed as governor in a legislative session on January 21, 2017.

Li was an alternate member of the 18th Central Committee of the Communist Party of China and is a full member of the 19th Central Committee.

References

1964 births
Living people
Northeast Normal University alumni
North China University of Water Conservancy and Electric Power alumni
Governors of Anhui
Chinese Communist Party politicians from Henan
Politicians from Xuchang
Alternate members of the 18th Central Committee of the Chinese Communist Party
Members of the 19th Central Committee of the Chinese Communist Party
Delegates to the 12th National People's Congress
Delegates to the 11th National People's Congress
Delegates to the 10th National People's Congress